The Childress Commercial and Civic Historic District is a  historic district in Childress, Texas which was listed on the National Register of Historic Places in 2016.  The district includes 93 contributing buildings, five contributing structures, three contributing sites, and two contributing objects, as well as 30 non-contributing buildings.

Over 60 acres are in the city's Fair Park, and it includes about 17 city blocks plus a discontiguous 1.3 acre parcel holding the former J.J. Rhoads School gymnasium and auditorium, a landmark in an historically African-American neighborhood.

The majority of its buildings are one-part or two-part commercial buildings, built of cast iron, brick, wood, stone and glass.  It includes brick-paved streets installed in the 1920s in much of the commercial area.

Two properties within the district are Recorded Texas Historic Landmarks (RTHL). These and other significant buildings include:
Childress Post Office Building (RTHL #830, 1991), 210 Third St. NW
Palace Theater (RTHL #13801, 2005), 206 N. Main St.
Former Childress High School, 700 Commerce St., now a junior high school
J.J. Rhoads School Gymnasium, 810 Ave. I NE

See also

National Register of Historic Places listings in Childress County, Texas
Recorded Texas Historic Landmarks in Childress County

References

External links

Historic districts on the National Register of Historic Places in Texas
National Register of Historic Places in Childress County, Texas
National Park Service rustic in Texas